The 1977 Detroit Lions season was their 48th in the National Football League (NFL). The team matched their previous season's output of 6–8, and missed the playoffs for the seventh straight season. The Lions struggled offensively, scoring a mere 183 points while finishing in third place with a 6–8 record for the second consecutive season.

The 1977 coaching staff included 25-year-old assistant special teams and offensive assistant coach Bill Belichick. Belichick would later win two Super Bowls in the 1986 and 1990 seasons as defensive coordinator with the New York Giants, and six as head coach of the New England Patriots.

NFL Draft 

Notes

 Detroit traded its first-round pick (12th) to Buffalo in exchange for WR J.D. Hill.
 Detroit traded QB Bill Munson to Seattle in exchange for Seattle's fifth-round pick (114th).
 Detroit traded its fifth-round pick (125th) to Pittsburgh in exchange for TE John McMakin.
 Detroit traded its sixth-round pick (320th) and G Guy Dennis to San Diego in exchange for G Mark Markovich.
 Detroit traded WR Marlin Briscoe to New England in exchange for a sixth-round pick (166th).

Personnel

Staff

Roster

Schedule

Standings

References 

Detroit Lions seasons
Detroit Lions
Detroit Lions